is a railway station in the city of Toyota, Aichi, Japan, operated by Meitetsu.

Lines
Takemura Station is served by the Meitetsu Mikawa Line and is 8.5 kilometers from the terminus of the line at Chiryū Station.

Station layout
The station  has a single island platform connected to the station building by a level crossing. The station has automated ticket machines, Manaca automated turnstiles and is unattended.

Platforms

Adjacent stations

|-
!colspan=5|Nagoya Railroad

Station history
Takemura Station was opened on July 5, 1920, as a station on the privately owned Mikawa Railway. The Mikawa Railway was merged with Meitetsu on June 1, 1941.

Passenger statistics
In fiscal 2017, the station was used by an average of 3216 passengers daily.

Surrounding area
 Toyota Technical High School
 Takemura Elementary School
 Ryujin Junior High School

See also
 List of Railway Stations in Japan

References

External links

 Official web page 

Railway stations in Japan opened in 1920
Railway stations in Aichi Prefecture
Stations of Nagoya Railroad
Toyota, Aichi